Braye-en-Laonnois is a commune in the department of Aisne in Hauts-de-France in northern France.

Population

Residents
Braye-en-Laonnois is the birthplace of stage and film actor Paul Vermoyal (1888-1925).

See also
 Communes of the Aisne department

References

Communes of Aisne
Aisne communes articles needing translation from French Wikipedia